The Millrose Games is an annual indoor athletics meet (track and field) held each February in New York City. They started taking place at the Armory in Washington Heights in 2012, after having taken place in Madison Square Garden from 1914 to 2011. The games were started when employees of the New York City branch of Wanamaker's department store formed the Millrose Track Club to hold a meet. The featured event is the Wanamaker Mile.

History 

The Millrose Games began in 1908 at a local armory the same year when its parent, the Millrose Athletic Association, was formed as a recreational club by the employees of the John Wanamaker Department Store. "Millrose" was the name of the country home of Rodman Wanamaker in Cheltenham, Pennsylvania.

In 1914, after overflowing the armory the year before, the Millrose Games moved to Madison Square Garden, and until 2011 was the oldest continuous sporting event held there. For 10 years beginning in 1916, the Wanamaker 1 ½ Mile race was a highlight of the meet. Run for the last time in 1925, the final edition was won by Paavo Nurmi, the nine-time Olympic gold medalist from Finland. In 1926, the distance was shortened, and the Wanamaker Mile was born. It has often been run at 10 p.m., a carryover from the days beginning in the 1930s when noted sports announcer Ted Husing would broadcast the race live on his 10 p.m. radio show.

The Wanamaker Mile has been won by over 44 different men, including Glenn Cunningham, Kip Keino, Tony Waldrop, Filbert Bayi, Steve Scott, Noureddine Morceli, Bernard Lagat, Marcus O'Sullivan, Ron Delany, and Eamonn Coghlan. Coghlan was known as the “Chairman of the Boards” for his dominance on the old wooden Millrose track and won the mile seven times, a feat surpassed only by Bernard Lagat, who won his eighth Wanamaker Mile in 2010.

For 70 of its first 96 years, the role of Millrose meet director was a father-son affair: Fred Schmertz directed the meet in 1934, passing on that position to his son Howard in 1975. In 2003, the title of Meet Director Emeritus was bestowed on the younger Schmertz.

In May 2011 Norbert Sanders, the President of the Millrose Games, announced that, starting January 2012, the games would be moved to the Armory in Washington Heights, at 168th Street, and that a new all-day Saturday schedule would replace the Friday evening format.

The Millrose Games, operated by The Armory Foundation, are also notable for their rigid anti-doping policies. In 2017, Millrose race director Ray Flynn told an ESPN reporter, "We have a mandate that we don't invite any athlete that has had any drug history in their past. We want to keep our meet free of any athlete that really has a violation."

Statistics 
The most prolific winner in event history is Loren Murchison, a sprinter who won 13 titles between 1919 and 1926. He is followed by pole vaulter Bob Richards (11), hurdler Greg Foster and 500-600-800m runner Mark Everett (10), and hurdler Harrison Dillard and miler Eamonn Coghlan (9). Coghlan’s total includes seven Wanamaker Mile victories and two Masters Mile wins.

Four women share the honor of most Millrose wins at eight apiece: 400-meter runner Diane Dixon, whose eight victories include five straight from 1988–1992; middle-distance runner Jearl Miles-Clark; shot putter Connie Price-Smith; and high jumper Tisha Waller.

202 athletes share the distinction of being both Millrose Games and Olympic champions.

Millrose Games Hall of Fame

World records
Over the course of its history, numerous world records have been set at the Millrose Games.

Meeting Records

Men

Women

References

External links
 
 Millrose Games & Wanamaker Mile

Recurring sporting events established in 1914
Track and field competitions in the United States
Sports competitions in New York City
Annual sporting events in the United States
IAAF Indoor Permit Meetings
Track and field in New York City